Cheryl Baldwin Turpin (born 1963) is an American politician who served as the delegate in the Virginia House of Delegates for the 85th district representing a part of Virginia Beach from 2018 to 2020. She is a member of the Democratic Party.

Early life and career
Turpin was born at Womack Hospital in Fort Bragg, North Carolina, in 1963 to George and Patricia Baldwin. She grew up in a military family that eventually settled in Fairfax County, Virginia. She has worked as a science teacher in Virginia Beach, most recently teaching at Frank W. Cox High School where she teaches Advanced Placement Environmental Science.

Political career
She won the general election to the Virginia House of Delegates for the 85th district held on November 7, 2017, to succeed Rocky Holcomb, whom she had lost to in a special election earlier in the year. In March 2019, Turpin declared her candidacy for the Senate of Virginia's 7th district after state senator Frank Wagner announced his retirement. She won the June 11 primary with 58% of the vote. In the November 2019 general election, Turpin lost to Republican Jen Kiggans by about a 1% margin.

Electoral history

References

Living people
Democratic Party members of the Virginia House of Delegates
Women state legislators in Virginia
Politicians from Virginia Beach, Virginia
1963 births
People from Fairfax County, Virginia
People from Fort Bragg, North Carolina
Virginia Commonwealth University alumni
Curry School of Education alumni
21st-century American politicians
21st-century American women politicians
20th-century American educators
20th-century American women educators
21st-century American educators
21st-century American women educators
Schoolteachers from North Carolina
Schoolteachers from Virginia